Iwanumaya Hotel (岩沼屋) is a hot spring ryokan located in Akiu Onsen, Taihaku Ward, Sendai City, Miyagi Prefecture.

Facilities 

The hotel features Japanese, Western, and mixed style rooms for a total of 148 rooms with capacity for 600 guests. There are indoor and outdoor baths separated by gender, however there is also a private family bath available to rent for an additional fee. Changing rooms, sauna, and showers are also inside the bathing facilities.  Other hotel facilities include a convention hall, banquet hall, special conference room, party room, conference room, karaoke salon, este and massage, bar, two restaurants, a noodle shop, gift shop, smoking room, and small-scale museum displays.  The hotel is located next to the 1,000 year old Hotel Sakan.

History 
The hot springs of Iwanumaya Hotel have been used since 1625.

 1625 Founded
 1952 July - First President Tachibana Naka establishes "Limited Company Iwanumaya Ryokan"
 1953 Remodel and expansion of rooms, large bath, etc. laid the foundation for today's hotel. Also during this period, the hotel became a member of the Japan Onsen Association and the Japan Tourism Ryokan Federation. The hotel has been designated a selected hotel by tavel agencies such at JTB.
1961 January - Renamed "Limited Company Iwanumaya Hotel"
 1965 November -Registered as a government international tourist inn (No. 600).
 1984 October - Construction of new annex Reireikan (麗景館)
 1995 October - Construction of new annex Seiryō-kan (清涼館)
2011 Damage from the Great East Japan Earthquake
 March 11 -The infrastructure of the hotel became inoperable, thus customer reservations were suspended. However, the buildings were designed to 120% of seismic standards. Therefore, it was designated by the nation as a wide-area emergency base for relief teams and emergency fire-fighting assistance corps.
 March 19 - Daily bathing in hot springs reopened to public
 April 1 - Except in the rooms provided for emergency teams, regular business resumed as part of "disaster recovery" (震災復興).
 April 4 - Lunch and hot spring day use plan resumed
 April 28 - Return to business as usual as pre-disaster conditions

Additional Information 
Iwanumaya Hotel was scheduled to be the Press Center for the G7 Finance Ministers and Central Bank Governors' Meeting held 20–21 May 2016 in Sendai.

Iwanumaya Hotel was featured as a location in the 32nd episode of the TV Asahi drama Seibu Keisatsu PART-III, a police drama television program running 3 April 1983 to 22 October 1984.

References

External links 
 Iwanumaya Hotel website (English) 
 Iwanumaya Hotel website (Japanese)

Hotels in Sendai
Hot springs of Japan
Ryokan